Keykuh (also Romanized as Keykūh; also known as Kadkūh) is a village in Narestan Rural District, Aqda District, Ardakan County, Yazd Province, Iran. At the 2006 census, its population was 51, in 16 families.

References 

Populated places in Ardakan County